The 2020–21 SK Slavia Prague season was the club's 28th season in the Czech First League. Slavia were reigning League champions, and participated in the Czech First League, Czech Cup, and the UEFA Champions League. Slavia won both the title and the cup, and also reached the quarter-finals of the UEFA Europa League.

In the final match of the league season on 29 May 2021, Slavia defeated Dynamo České Budějovice to clinch an undefeated record in the league. It was the first time a Czech club reached this milestone since rivals Sparta Prague did so in 2009–10.

Season events
On 3 August, it was announced that Slavia's friendly matches in Austria between 5 August and 14 August, would be played without fans in the stands due to the COVID-19 pandemic in Austria. On 11 August, Slavia's pre-season tour in Austria was ended prematurely after one of Slavia's players tested positive for COVID-19. The team will be placed into a two-weeks quarantine and may not be able to play the first league match against České Budějovice on 23 August.

On 17 August, Slavia announced that the entire 61-member squad was tested negative for the COVID-19. On this day, the league FA also released updates in the COVID manual and the team has been released from the quarantine. In line with the manual, the team may resume its training and get ready for a match-week 1.

As a result of Bayern Munich reaching the final of the 2019–20 UEFA Champions League, Slavia was promoted from the 3rd qualification round to the play-off round of the 2020–21 UEFA Champions League as Lyon now were unable to qualify for European competition.

On 20 August, at the pre-season press conference, the club announced the design of the 2020–21 home and away kit. The chairman Jaroslav Tvrdík also set goals for the upcoming season, a championship three-peat (winning the title for a third consecutive time) and a 2020–21 UEFA Champions League group-stage presence.

On 8 October, the Fortuna liga was postponed, initially until 25 October, but then extended until 3 November.

On 16 December, Slavia's games against Fastav Zlín, scheduled for the same day, was postponed due to COVID-19.

On 18 March, Slavia defender Ondřej Kúdela was accused of racially abusing Rangers midfielder Glen Kamara during a Europa League knockout match. Kúdela and Slavia resolutely denied the accusation. Slavia alleged Kúdela was assaulted after the match and the club lodged a criminal complaint. On 14 April, Kúdela was officially found guilty of racial abuse by UEFA and was banned for ten UEFA matches, ruling him out of Slavia's remaining Europa League matches and Euro 2020.

Transfers
On 17 July, Slavia announced the signing of Ondřej Karafiát from Slovan Liberec, to a four-year contract.

On 24 July, Tomáš Souček completed a permanent transfer to West Ham United where he had been on loan since January 2020, and Josef Hušbauer signed with Anorthosis Famagusta.

On 27 July, Slavia announced the signing of Michal Beran and Tomáš Malinský from Slovan Liberec, to a four-year and three-year contract respectively. On the same day, Jakub Jugas, Jan Matoušek and Daniel Kosek all were loaned to Slovan Liberec.

On 31 July, Alexandru Baluta signed with Puskás Akadémia.

On 5 August, Slavia announced the signing of Ondřej Lingr, to a four-year contract from MFK Karviná, and the permanent signing of Mohamed Tijani from Vysočina Jihlava after he'd spent the first half of 2020 on loan at Slavia.

On 9 August, Slavia announced a new three-year contract for Jan Bořil and a new four-year contract for Vladimír Coufal.

On 18 August, coach Jindřich Trpišovský has extended his contract by three years, until the summer of 2023 with an option for a two-year renewal. The speculation is that his remuneration will be CZK 1.3-1.4 million per month net of taxes with an additional bonus CZK 100,000 bonus for each achieved point in the league table. Also on 18 August, Martin Vantruba moved to Nordsjælland on loan for the season.

On 24 August, Michal Beran headed back to Slovan Liberec on a season-long loan deal. On the same day, Jan Sýkora left the team after a three-year spell for the Polish Ekstraklasa runner-up Lech Poznan.

On 25 August, Patrik Hellebrand was loaned back to 1. FC Slovácko on a season-long loan deal, with Slavia retaining the right to recall him in the winter transfer window.

On 31 August, Mick van Buren was loaned to České Budějovice for six months.

On 7 September, goalkeeper Jakub Markovič joined Mladá Boleslav on loan for the season, with fellow goalkeeper Jan Stejskal joining Slavia on a similar deal. On the say day, former player Miroslav Stoch began training with the club.

On 16 September, Michal Frydrych left Slavia to join Wisła Kraków.

On 25 September, Daniel Langhamer left Slavia to sign for Mladá Boleslav, with Slavia retaining a buy-back option.

On 1 October, Vladimír Coufal left Slavia to join West Ham United.

On 19 December, Slavia announced that Peter Olayinka had extended his contract with the club until June 2023.

On 3 January, Ondřej Karafiát returned to Slovan Liberec on loan for the remainder of the season, whilst Patrik Hellebrand moved on loan Opava after his previous loan deal with 1. FC Slovácko ended and Jan Stejskal and Jakub Markovič both had their loans cut short.

On 5 January, Slavia announced the signing of Alexander Bah on a four-and-a-half year contract, with Taras Kacharaba signing on loan from Slovan Liberec the next day with an option to make the move permanent.

On 20 January, Jakub Markovič moved to Vlašim on loan for the remainder of the season.

On 1 February, Petar Musa joined Union Berlin on loan for the remainder of the season, whilst Simon Deli returned to Slavia on a similar deal from Club Brugge.

Squad

Out on loan

Transfers

In

Loans in

Out

Loans out

Pre-season and friendlies

Competitions

Overall record

Czech First League

League table

Results summary

Results by round

Matches

Czech Cup

UEFA Champions League

Qualifying rounds

Play-off round

UEFA Europa League

Group stage

Knockout phase

Round of 32

Round of 16

Quarter-finals

Squad statistics

Appearances and goals

|-
|colspan="14"|Players away from Slavia Prague on loan:

|-
|colspan="14"|Players who left Slavia Prague during the season:

|}

Goal scorers

Clean sheets

Disciplinary record

References

External links
Official website

Slavia Prague
SK Slavia Prague seasons
Slavia Prague
Czech Republic football championship-winning seasons